The 57th Infantry Regiment was a unit in the Philippine Scouts. During their combat in Bataan members received 1 Medal of Honor, 21 Distinguished Service Crosses and 68 Silver Stars.

History

The 57th was formed in 1917 and transferred to the Philippines in 1921 and was one of the original units of the Philippine Division.

Lineage
Constituted 15 May 1917 in the regular Army as the 57th infantry. Organized 1 June 1917 at Camp Wilson, Texas from personnel of the 19th infantry. Assigned to the 15th Infantry Division 31 July 1918. Relieved from the 15th Division 18 May 1919. Transferred, without personnel, to the Philippine Department and consolidated with 2nd Philippine Infantry (Provisional)(Organized 5 April 1918 from the 4th, 10th, and 15th Battalions, and the 72nd 73rd, 74th, and 75th Companies, Philippine Scouts) and redesignated 57th infantry (Philippine Scouts) 2 December 1920.
Assigned to the Philippine Division 22 October 1921. Surrendered with the Luzon Force to the Japanese 14th Army in the Philippine islands 9 April 1942.
Reorganized 6 April 1946 in the Philippine islands and 1st Battalion expanded and redesignated 78th Infantry (Philippine Scouts); Concurrently new 1st Battalion constituted and organized. Inactivated 1 June 1949 in the Philippine islands. Disbanded 10 October 1951.

Distinctive unit insignia
 Description
A Silver color metal and enamel device  in height consisting of a shield blazoned: Parti per fess Argent and Azure, in chief a sea lion holding in dexter paw a musket with bayonet Gules, in base a mullet within a wreath both of the first; on a canton of the second a rock of the first charged with a shoulder strap of a second lieutenant of Infantry of 1863 Proper. Attached below and to the sides of the shield a Silver scroll inscribed "ANYWHERE-ANYTIME" in Blue letters.
 Symbolism
The Regiment was organized in 1917 at Fort Sam Houston by transfer of men from the 19th. The shield is of the Infantry colors with the station of the Regiment indicated by the sea lion of the Philippines holding the musket in the upper portion of the shield and the device of Texas, the star and wreath, in the lower part denoting the place of birth. The parentage of the Regiment is shown in the canton which displays the crest of the 19th United States Infantry. The 19th was a portion of General George H. Thomas’ command at Chickamauga in 1863. At the end of the second day (20 September) the entire Federal line had given way excepting Thomas. The 19th held but it had been so roughly used, four officers and 51 men fit for duty, that at sundown the remains of the entire Regiment was in command of a Second Lieutenant. This is shown by the rock and the shoulder strap.
 Background
The distinctive unit insignia was approved on 24 March 1924. It was rescinded/cancelled on 4 March 1976.

Coat of arms
Blazon
 Shield- Parti per fess Argent and Azure, in chief a sea lion holding in dexter paw a musket with bayonet Gules, in base a mullet within a wreath both of the first; on a canton of the second a rock of the first charged with a shoulder strap of a second lieutenant of Infantry of 1863 Proper.
 Crest- None.
 Motto- ANYWHERE ANYTIME.
Symbolism
 Shield- The Regiment was organized in 1917 at Fort Sam Houston by transfer of men from the 19th. The shield is of the Infantry colors with the station of the Regiment indicated by the sea lion of the Philippines holding the musket in the upper portion of the shield and the device of Texas, the star and wreath, in the lower part denoting the place of birth. The parentage of the Regiment is shown in the canton which displays the crest of the 19th United States Infantry. The 19th was a portion of General George H. Thomas’ command at Chickamauga in 1863. At the end of the second day (20 September) the entire Federal line had given way excepting Thomas. The 19th held but it had been so roughly used, four officers and 51 men fit for duty, that at sundown the remains of the entire Regiment was in command of a Second Lieutenant. This is shown by the rock and the shoulder strap.
 Crest- None.
Background- The coat of arms was approved on 5 June 1922. It was rescinded/cancelled on 4 March 1976.

Honors

Campaign participation credit

Decorations

See also
Alexander R. Nininger - Medal of Honor Recipient.
Arthur W. Wermuth - Distinguished Service Cross recipient dubbed "One man army of Bataan"

References

External links
Military.com 57th Infantry

057
057
Military history of the Philippines
American military personnel of Filipino descent
United States Army regiments of World War I